The 2017 BBL Playoffs was the concluding postseason of the 2016–17 Basketball Bundesliga season. The Playoffs started on 5 May and ended on 11 June 2017.

Playoff qualifying

Bracket

Quarterfinals
The quarterfinals were played in a best of five format from 5 to 18 May 2017.

ratiopharm Ulm vs MHP Riesen Ludwigsburg

Brose Bamberg vs Telekom Baskets Bonn

Bayern Munich vs Alba Berlin

Medi bayreuth vs EWE Baskets Oldenburg

Semifinals
The semifinals were played in a best of five format from 20 May to 1 June 2017.

ratiopharm Ulm vs EWE Baskets Oldenburg

Brose Bamberg vs Bayern Munich

Final
The final was played in a best of five format from 4 to 11 June 2017.

References

External links
Official website 

BBL Playoffs
2016–17 in German basketball leagues